Wkra is a river in north-eastern Poland.

Wkra may also refer to:

 Uecker, a river in Germany
 , a tributary of the Mołstowa in Poland
 Wkra, Masovian Voivodeship, a village in Poland
 Wkra railway station
 WKRA (AM), a radio station (1110 AM) licensed to Holly Springs, Mississippi, United States
 WKRA-FM, a radio station (92.7 FM) licensed to Holly Springs, Mississippi, United States